Hill Top is a village in County Durham, England. It is situated to the west of Tantobie, near Stanley.

References

Villages in County Durham